James J. F. Forest is an author and a professor at the University of Massachusetts Lowell (UMass Lowell).

Biography
Forest founded the Center for Terrorism and Security Studies (CTSS) at UMass Lowell in 2013 and served as its Director from 2015 to 2016.

He is also a visiting professor at the Fletcher School of Law and Diplomacy. He is the former director of Terrorism Studies at the United States Military Academy and a former senior fellow at the U.S. Joint Special Operations University.

He has been cited as a terrorism expert by dozens of news outlets including CNN, CBS, The Globe Post, CNBC, and the Christian Science Monitor, and is co-editor of the academic research journal Perspectives on Terrorism.

Selected publications

Books
 Digital Influence Warfare in the Age of Social Media ABC-CLIO/Praeger (2021) 
 The Terrorism Lectures Nortia Press (2012, 2015, 2019) 
 Essentials of Counterterrorism Praeger (2015) 
 Intersections of Crime and Terrorism Routledge (2013) 
 Countering the Terrorism Threat of Boko Haram in Nigeria JSOU Press (2012) 
 Weapons of Mass Destruction and Terrorism (2nd Edition) McGraw-Hill (2011) 
 Influence Warfare: How Terrorists and Governments Fight to Shape Perceptions in a War of Ideas Praeger (2009) 
 Handbook of Defence Politics: International and Comparative Perspectives Routledge (2008) 
 Countering Terrorism and Insurgency in the 21st Century: International Perspectives Praeger (2007) 
 Homeland Security: Public spaces and social institutions Praeger (2006) 
 Teaching Terror: Strategic and tactical learning in the terrorist world Rowman & Littlefield (2005)

Articles and other publications
 “Political Warfare and Propaganda,” Journal of Advanced Military Studies vol. 12, no. 1 (Spring 2021). 
 “Prevention of Public Panic in the Wake of Terrorist Incidents” (w/Juan Merizalde and John Colautti) in The Handbook of Terrorism Prevention and Preparedness, edited by Alex P. Schmid (The Hague: ICCT Press, 2021). 
 “Tracking Terrorism: The Role of Technology in Risk Assessment and Monitoring of Terrorist Offenders” (w/Neil Shortland), in Science Informed Policing, edited by Bryanna Fox, Joan A. Reid and Anthony J. Masys (London: Springer, 2020). 
 “Crime-Terror Interactions in Sub-Saharan Africa,” Studies in Conflict and Terrorism (Oct. 2019). 
“150 Un- and Under-Researched Topics and Themes in the Field of (Counter-) Terrorism Studies,” Perspectives on Terrorism Vol. 12, No. 4 (August 2018)
 “Why do Ethnopolitical Organizations Turn to Crime?” (with Victor Asal and Brian Nussbaum) Global Crime 16, no. 4. 
 “Behavioral Patterns among (Violent) Non-State Actors: A Study of Complementary Governance” (with Annette I. Idler). Stability: International Journal of Security and Development 4(1): 2 (January 2015).
 U.S. Military Deployments to Africa: Lessons from the Hunt for Joseph Kony and the Lord’s Resistance Army. Tampa, FL: JSOU Press.
 Countering the al-Shabaab Insurgency in Somalia: Lessons for U.S. Special Operations Forces (with Joshua Meservey and Graham Turbiville). Tampa, FL: JSOU Press.
 "A Framework for Analyzing the Future Threat of WMD Terrorism," Journal of Strategic Security (Winter 2012)
 "Perception Challenges Faced by Al-Qaeda on the Battlefield of Influence Warfare," Perspectives on Terrorism (April 2012)
 “Ungoverned Territories: Engaging Local Nongovernmental Entities in U.S. Security Strategy,” Atlantic Perspective (July 2011)
 Harmony and Disharmony: Exploiting al-Qa'ida’s Organizational Vulnerabilities (with Joe Felter, Jarret Brachman et al.). West Point, NY: Combating Terrorism Center, United States Military Academy (February 14, 2006).

References

External links
Personal website

Living people
Year of birth missing (living people)
University of Massachusetts faculty